Rock the Night is the first live album by the American blues rock guitarist Robert Walker. It was recorded on February 4, 2000 and released on October 23, 2001 by Rooster Blues.

Track listing 
"Cut You A Loose" (London) — 4:33
"Found Love" (Reed) — 3:45
"Rooster Blues" (West) — 3:43
"Linda Lu" (Sharpe) — 2:51
"Standing at My Window/Don't Answer the Door" (Crudup, Johnson) — 5:38
"Truck Driving Man" (Fell) — 2:02
"Why I Sing the Blues" (Clark, King) — 3:58
"Memphis" (Berry) — 2:54
"Stagger Lee" (traditional) — 3:50
"Robert B. Goode/Little Queenie" (Berry) — 3:57
"Hide Away" (King, Thompson) — 3:32

Personnel 
Performers:
David "Pecan" Porter — bass
Sam Carr — drums
Robert Walker — guitar, vocals
Production:
Jim O'Neal — producer, mixing
Tomas Ford — engineer
Jack LeTourneau — engineer, mixing
Bill Steber — photography
Jannell Turner — art direction, design, photography

Reception 
After the blandness of Rompin' & Stompin', Rock the Night fared considerably better. This was due in part to having fellow veteran musicians such as Carr and Porter, who are "as wild as Walker, but less wayward." The "tethering" of Walker by the others leads to some fun moments. That does not mean that they performed flawlessly, though, since reviewer Chris Smith comments how "Hide Way" "has so many wrong notes that it's almost a new composition", and that other songs also get "a thorough mauling."

References

Robert Walker (musician) albums
2001 live albums
Live blues albums